John Beckwith (born 16 September 1932) is a former Australian rules football player and coach, for the Melbourne Football Club in the Victorian Football League (VFL).

Beckwith's father, Wally Beckwith, was a VFL player for Fitzroy and was also a VFL umpire.

Beckwith won the 1949 Federal Football League's Under 18 best and fairest award with Black Rock.

Beckwith made his debut in round one against Essendon at Windy Hill. Essendon had been premiers the previous year and as such it was the unfurling of the 1950 premiership flag. The players had to line up, and General Sir Dallas Brooks, the Governor of Victoria, came past. Beckwith was only 19 years of age, and meeting the governor as well as playing his first game of VFL football was a nerve-wracking experience, although he did end up kicking a goal.

Beckwith was a member of Melbourne premiership sides in 1955–1957 and 1959–1960. He won a club best and fairest award in 1957, and captained the Demons from 1957 to 1959.

Beckwith spent five years as captain-coach of Colac Football Club in the Hampden Football League from 1961 to 1965. Under his guidance Colac won two premierships and were runners up twice.

Beckwith was an assistant coach at Melbourne in 1966. He coached Melbourne from 1967 to 1970 for 19 wins and 46 losses.

He was named in the back pocket in Melbourne 'Team of the Century'.

See also
List of Australian rules football families

References

External links

DemonWiki profile

1932 births
Melbourne Football Club players
Living people
Melbourne Football Club coaches
Keith 'Bluey' Truscott Trophy winners
Melbourne Football Club captains
Colac Football Club players
Australian rules footballers from Victoria (Australia)
Five-time VFL/AFL Premiership players
Melbourne Football Club Premiership players